Larama Quta (Aymara larama blue, quta lake, "blue lake", Hispanicized spelling Laramacota) is a  mountain in the Andes of southern Peru. It is situated in the Moquegua Region, General Sánchez Cerro Province, Ichuña District, northeast of Jukumarini Lake. Larama Quta lies at a river of the same name which originates northeast of the mountain. It flows to the south.

References

Mountains of Moquegua Region
Mountains of Peru